George Carroll (January 6, 1922 – January 14, 2016) was an American lawyer who was an important civic figure in Contra Costa County, California, and the city of Richmond.

Biography
Carroll was born on January 6, 1922, in Brooklyn, New York. Later he served in the United States Military during World War II and subsequently attended college and law school by use of the G.I. Bill. He relocated to Contra Costa County, California, in 1954.

He was the first black lawyer in Richmond, California. In 1961 Carroll became the first African American elected to the city council (1961–1964) and later became the first black mayor of Richmond (1964–65) or any large American city. Afterwards George Carroll became the first black judge in Contra Costa when he was appointed to the Bay Municipal Court by Governor Pat Brown in 1965.

Legacy
The Richmond Courthouse and a park in the Pt. Richmond District are named in his honor.

Death
Carroll died in his sleep on January 14, 2016, in Richmond, California, at the age of 94.

References

External links
Black History of Richmond

African-American judges
American judges
Mayors of Richmond, California
1922 births
2016 deaths
African-American mayors in California
Richmond City Council members (California)
California city council members
People from Brooklyn
American military personnel of World War II
20th-century African-American politicians
African-American men in politics
20th-century American politicians
Military personnel from New York City
20th-century American judges
African Americans in World War II
21st-century African-American people